Peter Winbäck (born 30 September 1982) is a Swedish former bandy midfielder.

Winbäck played for Hälleforsnäs IF, Katrineholms SK, Värmbol-Katrineholm BK, IK Sirius, Hammarby IF, Gustavsbergs IF, Tillberga IK, and Djurgårdens IF.

References

External links

1982 births
Swedish bandy players
Living people
Hälleforsnäs IF players
Katrineholms SK Bandy players
IK Sirius players
Hammarby IF Bandy players
Gustavsbergs IF players
Tillberga IK Bandy players
Djurgårdens IF Bandy players